Kwaku Duah Ahinful (born March 19, 1985) is a Ghanaian football striker, who currently plays for Berekum Arsenal.

Career 
Ahninful began his career in his hometown Prestea with Mine Stars and joined in 2006 to Ashanti Gold SC, he signed on 11 July 2008 for Berekum Arsenal and left Ashanti Gold SC.

References 

1985 births
Living people
Ghana international footballers
Ghanaian footballers
Berekum Arsenal players
Ashanti Gold SC players
Association football midfielders